Gourd Music is a record label featuring acoustic instrumental music with various ensembles of guitar, cello, flute, oboe, harp, fiddle, hammered and mountain dulcimer, banjo and mandolin.

Gourd Music was founded by Neal Hellman in 1988.

Genres published include Shaker music, music of Colonial America, Victorian music and music of the American Civil War. Gourd albums range in style from traditional Celtic to old-time Appalachian; from galliards to jigs; from monasteries to mountain cabins; from courtly measures to rollicking sprees.

Gourd artists 
 William Coulter
 Cheryl Ann Fulton
 Neal Hellman
 Mary McLaughlin
 Robin Petrie
 Barry Phillips
 Shelley Phillips
 Todd Phillips
 Kim Robertson
 Martin Simpson
 Jim Taylor

See also 
 List of record labels

External links
 Official website
 FolkLib Index - Gourd Music discography

American record labels
Record labels established in 1987